Pseudorhombilidae is a family of crabs.

Genera
The World Register of Marine Species lists the following genera:
Bathyrhombila Hendrickx, 1998
Chacellus Guinot, 1969
Euphrosynoplax Guinot, 1969
Nanoplax Guinot, 1967
Oediplax Rathbun, 1894
Perunorhombila Števcic, 2005
Pseudorhombila H. Milne Edwards, 1837
Trapezioplax Guinot, 1969

References

Xanthoidea
Decapod families